Shchi is a Russian-style cabbage soup. When sauerkraut is used instead, the soup is called sour shchi, while soups based on sorrel, spinach, nettle, and similar plants are called green shchi (zelionyje shchi). In the past, the term sour shchi was also used to refer to a drink, a variation of kvass, which was unrelated to the soup.

History
Cabbage soups have been known in Kievan Rus as far back as the 9th century, soon after cabbage was introduced from Byzantium. Its popularity in Russia originates from several factors. Shchi is relatively easy to prepare; it can be cooked with or without various types of meat; and it can be frozen and carried as a solid on a trip to be cut up when needed. As a result, by the 10th century shchi became a staple food of Russia, and a popular saying sprang from this fact: "Щи да каша — пища наша." (Shchi da kasha — pishcha nasha "Shchi and kasha are our food"). The major components of shchi were originally cabbage, meat (beef, pork, lamb, or poultry), mushrooms, flour, and spices (based on onion and garlic). Cabbage and meat were cooked separately and smetana was added as a garnish before serving. Shchi is traditionally eaten with rye bread.

The ingredients of shchi gradually changed. Flour, which was added in early times to increase the soup's caloric value, was excluded for the sake of finer taste. The spice mixture was enriched with black pepper and bay leaf, which were imported to Russia around the 15th century, also from Byzantium. Meat was sometimes substituted with fish, while carrot and parsley could be added to the vegetables. Beef was the most popular meat for shchi in Russia, while pork was more common in Ukraine. The water-to-cabbage ratio varied and whereas early shchi was often so viscous that a spoon could stand in it, more diluted preparation was adopted later.

Linguistics
The two-letter word щи contains the letter щ, which lacks a counterpart in most non-Cyrillic alphabets and is transcribed into them with several letters. In German, щи becomes eight letters, Schtschi. Devanagari script can render щи with only one glyph श्ची, albeit one that takes four keystrokes to type श ् च ी which combine to give श्ची.

See also

 Borscht
 Rassolnik
 Solyanka
 Kapusniak
 List of cabbage dishes
 List of Russian dishes
 List of soups
 List of vegetable soups

References

Russian soups
Cabbage soups
National dishes